Carroll High School can refer to:

In the United States
Carroll High School (Alabama), Ozark, Alabama
Carroll High School (Flora, Indiana), Flora, Indiana
Carroll High School (Fort Wayne, Indiana), Fort Wayne, Indiana
Carroll High School (Iowa), Carroll, Iowa
Carroll County High School (Kentucky), Carrollton, Kentucky
Carroll High School (Monroe, Louisiana), Monroe, Louisiana
Carroll High School (Dayton, Ohio), Dayton, Ohio
Archbishop John Carroll High School, Radnor, Pennsylvania
Mary Carroll High School, Corpus Christi, Texas
Carroll Senior High School, Southlake, Texas
Carroll County High School (Virginia), Hillsville, Virginia
Archbishop Carroll High School (Washington, D.C.), Washington, D.C.

In Liberia 
Carroll High School (Yekepa), Yekepa, Nimba County